Dominic Alford (born February 22, 1988) is an American football offensive lineman who is currently a free agent.

College career
He played college football at the University of Minnesota, where he played right guard and left guard.

Professional career

Cleveland Browns (2011–2012)
On July 30, 2011, Alford was signed by Cleveland Browns as an undrafted free agent. On September 3, 2011, Alford was waived by the Cleveland Browns. He cleared waivers and was placed on the Browns' practice squad. On January 3, 2012, the Cleveland Browns signed Alford to a reserve/future contract. On August 31, 2012, he was waived by the Cleveland Browns.

Carolina Panthers (2012)
On December 4, 2012, the Carolina Panthers signed Alford to the practice squad.

Cleveland Browns (2013)
On February 6, 2013, Alford was signed by the Cleveland Browns. On July 24, 2013, Alford was cut by the Cleveland Browns. On August 3, 2013, the Cleveland Browns re-signed Alford.

Cleveland Gladiators (2014)
On February 3, 2014, Alford was assigned to the Cleveland Gladiators of the Arena Football League (AFL).

Hamilton Tiger-Cats (2014)
Alford signed a contract with the Hamilton Tiger-Cats on April 25, 2014. He was released by the Tiger-Cats on September 12, 2014.

References

External links
 Cleveland Browns bio

1988 births
Living people
Cleveland Browns players
Minnesota Golden Gophers football players
Players of American football from Cleveland
Cleveland Gladiators players